In mathematical logic, the Friedman translation is a certain transformation of intuitionistic formulas. Among other things it can be used to show that the Π02-theorems of various first-order theories of classical mathematics are also theorems of intuitionistic mathematics. It is named after its discoverer, Harvey Friedman.

Definition
Note that ¬A is defined as an abbreviation for  hence

Application
The Friedman translation can be used to show the closure of many intuitionistic theories under the Markov rule, and to obtain partial conservativity results.  The key condition is that the  sentences of the logic be decidable, allowing the unquantified theorems of the intuitionistic and classical theories to coincide.

For example, if A is provable in Heyting arithmetic (HA), then AB is also provable in HA. This implies that:
Heyting arithmetic is closed under the primitive recursive Markov rule (MPPR): if the formula ¬¬A is provable in HA, where A is a Σ01-formula, then A is also provable in HA.
Peano arithmetic is Π02-conservative over Heyting arithmetic: if Peano arithmetic proves a Π02-formula A, then A is already provable in HA.

See also
Gödel–Gentzen negative translation

Notes

Proof theory
Constructivism (mathematics)